Willyan da Silva Barbosa (born 17 February 1994) is a Brazilian footballer who plays for K League 1 club FC Seoul, on loan from Daejeon Hana Citizen. He also holds Italian nationality.

Career
Willyan played youth football in homeland Brazil with Bahia and Leme.

In January 2011, he was signed by Italian Serie B club Torino, where he played for their youth team until 2013. 

On 10 August 2013, Willyan was signed by Portuguese Segunda Liga club Beira-Mar in a temporary deal. He was signed permanently on 29 January 2014 on a three-and-a-half-year contract.

References

External links
 
 

1994 births
Living people
Sportspeople from Bahia
Brazilian footballers
Brazilian people of Italian descent
Association football wingers
Torino F.C. players
S.C. Beira-Mar players
C.D. Nacional players
Vitória F.C. players
Panetolikos F.C. players
Gwangju FC players
Gyeongnam FC players
Daejeon Hana Citizen FC players
FC Seoul players
Liga Portugal 2 players
Primeira Liga players
Super League Greece players
K League 2 players
K League 1 players
Brazilian expatriate footballers
Brazilian expatriate sportspeople in Portugal
Brazilian expatriate sportspeople in Greece
Brazilian expatriate sportspeople in South Korea
Expatriate footballers in Portugal
Expatriate footballers in Greece
Expatriate footballers in South Korea